Alkwertatherium is an extinct genus of marsupial of the family Diprotodontidae. Only one species has been described, Alkwertatherium webbi, from the Late Miocene of Northern Territory, Australia.

References

 Heritage Advisory Council. Alcoota Fossil Beds. Heritage Notes 2002.
 Alkwertatherium webbi

Prehistoric vombatiforms
Miocene mammals of Australia
Miocene marsupials
Prehistoric monotypic mammal genera
Prehistoric marsupial genera
Fossil taxa described in 1990